Protein unc-84 homolog B is a protein that in humans is encoded by the UNC84B gene.

References

Further reading